The 1976 Humboldt State Lumberjacks football team represented Humboldt State University during the 1976 NCAA Division II football season. Humboldt State competed in the Far Western Conference (FWC).

The 1976 Lumberjacks were led by head coach Bud Van Deren in his 11th season. They played home games at the Redwood Bowl in Arcata, California. Humboldt State finished with a record of five wins and five losses (5–5, 4–1 FWC). The Lumberjacks were outscored by their opponents 154–261 for the season.

Schedule

Notes

References

Humboldt State
Humboldt State Lumberjacks football seasons
Humboldt State Lumberjacks football